Route 50, also known as Thorburn Road and St. Thomas Line, is a  east-west highway on the Avalon Peninsula of Newfoundland in the Canadian province of Newfoundland and Labrador. It extends from the city of St. John's west to Paradise.

Route description

Route 50 begins in the town of Paradise at an intersection with Route 60 (Topsail Road). It heads north as St. Thomas Line through neighbourhoods to cross into Portugal Cove-St. Philips, where it passes through the St. Philips portion of town to have an intersection with Route 41 (Tuckers Hill Road), which leads to the Bell Island Ferry, and becomes Thorburn Road. The highway now winds its way southeast through rural areas to enter the St. John's city limits at an interchange with Route 1 (Trans-Canada Highway/Outer Ring Road, Exit 44). Route 50 continues east through neighbourhoods to cross over Route 3A (Team Gushue Highway) without an interchange and have an intersection with Goldstone Street. It now enters a business district as it passes by the Avalon Mall to have an intersection with The Parkway (Columbus Drive/Prince Philip Drive). The highway now curves to the curves to the south and comes to an end shortly thereafter at an intersection between Kenmount Road and Freshwater Road (former Route 1).

A small section of Thorburn Road branches off of Tuckers Hill Road (Route 41) toward Broad Cove, though this part becomes Thorpes Road before reaching the cove.

Major intersections

References

050
Streets in St. John's, Newfoundland and Labrador